In ancient Roman culture, infamia (in-, "not," and fama, "reputation") was a loss of legal or social standing. As a technical term of Roman law, infamia was an official exclusion from the legal protections enjoyed by a Roman citizen, as imposed by a censor or praetor. More generally, especially during the Republic and Principate, infamia was informal damage to one's esteem or reputation. A person who suffered infamia was an infamis (plural infames).

Infamia was an "inescapable consequence" for certain professionals, including undertakers, executioners, prostitutes and pimps, entertainers such as actors and dancers, and gladiators. Two jurists of the later Imperial era argue against the "infamous" status of charioteers, on the grounds that athletic competitions were not mere entertainment but "seem useful" as instructive  displays of Roman strength and virtus. Infames could not, for instance, provide testimony in a court of law. They were liable to corporal punishment, which was usually reserved for slaves. The infamia of entertainers did not exclude them from socializing among the Roman elite, and entertainers who were "stars", both men and women, sometimes became the lovers of such high-profile figures as Mark Antony and the dictator Sulla.

A passive homosexual who was "outed" might also be subject to social infamia, although if he were a citizen he might retain his legal standing.

Infamy
The modern Roman Catholic Church has a similar concept called infamy.

See also
Sexuality in ancient Rome

References

External links
  

Roman law
Social classes in ancient Rome